Ingleside Independent School District is a public school district based in Ingleside, Texas (USA). It is known as the Home of the Fighting Mustangs.

In addition to most of Ingleside, the district also serves the city of Ingleside on the Bay and includes sections of Corpus Christi in San Patricio County.

In 2009, the school district was rated "academically acceptable" by the Texas Education Agency.

In 2010, the school district was rated "recognized" by the Texas Education Agency.

Schools
Ingleside High (Grades 9-12)
Leon Taylor Junior High (Grades 7-8)
Blaschke/Sheldon Elementary (Grades 5-6)
Gilbert J. Mircovich Elementary (Grades 2-4)
Ingleside Primary (Grades PK-1)

Grades PK-1 were originally located in Elizabeth Cook Primary before the school closed.

Mascots 
High School: Mustangs
Junior High: Ponies

References

External links
 

School districts in San Patricio County, Texas
Education in Corpus Christi, Texas